Nyírlugos is a town in Szabolcs-Szatmár-Bereg county, in the Northern Great Plain region of eastern Hungary.

Geography
Its population was 2699 as of 2015.

Notable residents
 Balázs Dzsudzsák, Hungarian footballer

References

Populated places in Szabolcs-Szatmár-Bereg County